College Confidential is a 1960 American B-movie drama directed by Albert Zugsmith and starring Steve Allen, Jayne Meadows and Mamie Van Doren.

Plot
Sociology professor Steve McInter conducts a survey at Collins College about the lifestyles and sexual urges of the younger generation. One of his students, Sally Blake, excels with the survey and may be having an affair with the professor. Reporter Betty Ducayne receives an anonymous tip that Steve is corrupting the youth and she discovers the dark past that he had fled.

Cast
Steve Allen as Steve McInter
Jayne Meadows as Betty Ducayne
Mamie Van Doren as Sally Blake
Rocky Marciano as Deputy Sheriff
Mickey Shaughnessy as Sam Grover
Cathy Crosby as Fay Grover
Herbert Marshall as Professor Henry Addison
Conway Twitty as Marvin
Randy Sparks as Phil
Pamela Mason as Edna Blake
Elisha Cook, Jr. as Ted Blake
Theona Bryant as Lois Addison

Production
The film was an unofficial follow-up to High School Confidential from two years prior, although made for a different studio. Director Joe Dante, who spoofed said follow-up on the 1979 Ramones vehicle Rock 'n' Roll High School, asked Allen about making College Confidential at one point and the latter said that it was going to be progressive. It has never been available on any home media.

References

External links

 
 College Confidential at TCMDB
 Review of film at Film Fanatic

1960 films
1960 drama films
American drama films
1960s English-language films
Films set in universities and colleges
Universal Pictures films
Films scored by Dean Elliott
Films directed by Albert Zugsmith
1960s American films